Wanhua  may refer to:
 Wanhua District, Taipei, Taiwan
 Wanhua Group (disambiguation), several (former) closely related companies.
 Wanhua Chemical Group, the 37th largest chemical companies of the world, sometimes known as just Wanhua

See also
 Kaleidoscope, known in Japanese as